Eupseudosoma involutum, the snowy eupseudosoma, is a moth of the family Erebidae. The species was first described by Sepp in 1855. It is found from the southern United States (Florida) to Argentina, as well as on the Antilles.

The wingspan is about 33 mm.

The larvae feed on Psidium guineense, Eugenia and Eucalyptus species.

References

Phaegopterina
Moths described in 1855